Wilhelm Resetarits (21 December 1948 – 24 April 2022), better known as Willi Resetarits and Ostbahn Kurti, was an Austrian singer, comedian and human rights activist.

Biography
Resetarits was born in Stinatz in the Austrian state of Burgenland. His family moved to Vienna when he was three. He studied sports and English studies intending to become a teacher, but his successful career as a musician intervened.

1970s
In 1969 Resetarits joined the political rock band Schmetterlinge (Butterflies). They participated in the Eurovision Song Contest 1977 in London with the song "Boom-Boom-Boomerang", which came in next-to-last place in Eurovision voting.

In the mid-1980s, together with his colleague Günter Brödl he developed his alter ego Dr. Kurt Ostbahn, an excessive personality with an intense stage presence, which turned out to be very successful. The name was created in the mid-1970s, when Günter Brödl was asked during a radio show what American musicians like Southside Johnny & the Asbury Jukes would call themselves if they were from Vienna. He answered Ostbahn Kurti & die Chefpartie, which a decade later became the name of Willi Resetarits and his band. Resetarits also introduced the musical form of Favorit'n'Blues, a Viennese form of rhythm and blues. After Günter Brödl died unexpectedly in 2000, Dr. Kurt Ostbahn went on a final commemoration tour and then announced in December 2003 that he would let his alter ego retire.

However, after the "official" retirement of Dr. Kurt Ostbahn after the last concert on 31 December 2003, there were 4 other appearances as Dr. Kurt Ostbahn: 10 and 11 October 2010 - initially announced as CD box presentation - two memorial concerts around the 10th anniversary of Brödls death. On 27 and 28 August 2011, celebrating the 20th anniversary of the infamous "Ostbahn XI" open-air concert. In all four concerts, Resetarits/Ostbahn was joined on stage by a selection of musicians from his two bands, "Chefpartie" and "Kombo".

From 1995 to 1998 Trost und Rat von und mit Dr. Kurt Ostbahn (Solace and advice by and with Kurt Ostbahn, Ph.D.) was a very popular weekly radio show in Vienna, which verified Resetarits as an extraordinary entertainer. In 2006 the broadcast carried on, this time featuring Willi Resetarits instead of Dr. Kurt Ostbahn.

Even after the retirement of his alter ego Ostbahn Kurti/Dr. Kurt Ostbahn, Resetarits was very successful with very different music productions. In 2006 he was on tour with the Kurdish singer Sivan Perwer presenting World music and together with the Xtra Combo Resetarits interpreted a wild mixture of Croatian Folk music, Wienerlieder (traditional Viennese ballads), Jazz and Blues as Stubnblues.

Resetarits was a human rights activist and one of the founders of the humanitarian organisations Asyl in Not and SOS Mitmensch. He was also one of the founders and chairman of the Integration House Vienna. 

He has made frequent appearances on Austrian TV and in film productions.

Lukas Resetarits (cabaret artist and actor on TV) and Peter Resetarits (TV host at ORF) are his brothers. Karin Resetarits, a present member of the European Parliament, is his divorced sister-in-law.

Awards
 1996: Nestroy-Ring
 1998: Bruno Kreisky Award for Human Rights
 2000: Josef-Felder-Prize für Gemeinwohl und Zivilcourage (Germany)
 2003: Karl Renner-Prize

References

External links 
 Official site (in German)
 
 

1948 births
2022 deaths 
Accidental deaths in Austria 
Accidental deaths from falls
20th-century Austrian male singers
21st-century Austrian male singers
Austrian comedians
Austrian cabaret performers
Austrian human rights activists
Austrian people of Croatian descent
People from Güssing District
Wienerlied
Recipients of the Austrian Cross of Honour for Science and Art